Dyschirius arnoldii is a species of ground beetle in the subfamily Scaritinae. It was described by Gryuntal in 1984.

References

arnoldii
Beetles described in 1984